Hechtia mooreana is a species of plant in the genus Hechtia, endemic to Mexico.

References

mooreana
Flora of Mexico